Attorney General Thomas may refer to:

David Thomas (Texas politician) (1795–1836), Attorney General of the Republic of Texas
James Houston Thomas (1808–1876), Attorney General of Tennessee
James Kay Thomas (1902–1989), Attorney General of West Virginia
Jesse B. Thomas Jr. (1806–1850), Attorney General of Illinois
Michael David Thomas (born 1933), Attorney General of Hong Kong
Tommy Thomas (barrister) (born 1952), Attorney General of Malaysia

See also
General Thomas (disambiguation)